Chad Wayne Ogea (born November 9, 1970) is an American former Major League Baseball pitcher.

Professional playing career
Ogea played his first five major league seasons with the Cleveland Indians and his final season with the Philadelphia Phillies. He may best be remembered for his surprising hitting ability in the 1997 World Series against the Florida Marlins.

1997 World Series
Ogea, having lost two games in the ALCS and winning no games in June, July, or August, managed to win two World Series games, both of them against Marlins ace Kevin Brown. In that Series, he gave up just two earned runs for an ERA of 1.54. Batting in Game 6 against Brown, Ogea managed to get his first hit since high school, knocking in two runs in the process. Later, he hit a double to lead off the 5th inning. He would score on Manny Ramírez's sacrifice fly. He became the first pitcher since Mickey Lolich to drive in two World Series runs and the first Cleveland Indians pitcher to drive in a World Series run since 1920.

References

External links
 Ogea's career statistics.

Philadelphia Phillies players
Cleveland Indians players
Kinston Indians players
Charlotte Knights players
Buffalo Bisons (minor league) players
Akron Aeros players
Columbus Clippers players
1970 births
Living people
Baseball players from Louisiana
LSU Tigers baseball players
Major League Baseball pitchers
Canton-Akron Indians players
Sportspeople from Lake Charles, Louisiana